The 1992 Nigerian Senate election in Katsina State was held on July 4, 1992, to elect members of the Nigerian Senate to represent Katsina State. Mahmud Kanti Bello representing Katsina North and Ibrahim Safana representing Katsina Central won on the platform of Social Democratic Party, while Abu Ibrahim representing Katsina South (Funtua) won on the platform of the National Republican Convention.

Overview

Summary

Results

Katsina North 
The election was won by Mahmud Kanti Bello of the Social Democratic Party.

Katsina Central 
The election was won by Ibrahim Safana of the Social Democratic Party.

Katsina South (Funtua) 
The election was won by Abu Ibrahim of the National Republican Convention.

References 

Kat
Katsina State Senate elections
July 1992 events in Nigeria